Alhuseineah (Arabic: الحسينية) is a Syrian village in the Qudsaya District of Wadi Barada. According to the Syria Central Bureau of Statistics (CBS), Alhuseineah huseineah had a population of 2,563 in the 2014 census. Its residents are predominantly Sunni Muslims.

References

Bibliography

Populated places in Qudsaya District